René Fatoux (2 December 1935 – 30 October 2022) was a French footballer who played as a forward.

Biography
Fatoux's club career began when he was aged 13 in Péronne. He then began training in Lens before joining Stade de Reims, where he played alongside Raymond Kopa and Albert Batteux.

In his professional career, Fatoux played for Lille OSC, Red Star F.C., RC Arras, SO Chambéry, and Grenoble Foot 38. He finished his career with Boiry as a player-coach when he was 50 years old. In addition to his football career, he was a physical education teacher. He received the Bronze  in 2010. That year, he began coaching the youth team of AC Cambrai.

René Fatoux died in Warlus, Pas-de-Calais on 30 October 2022, at the age of 86.

References

1935 births
2022 deaths
French footballers
Association football forwards
Ligue 1 players
Ligue 2 players
Lille OSC players
Red Star F.C. players
Arras FA players
Chambéry SF players
Grenoble Foot 38 players
Sportspeople from Pas-de-Calais